Quick Step & Side Kick is the third studio album by the British new wave group Thompson Twins. It was released in February 1983 by Arista Records, and was their first album to be released as a trio (the band consisted of up to seven members during previous releases). The album reached no. 2 on the UK Albums Chart and was later certified Platinum by the BPI.

In the United States and Canada, the album was titled simply as Side Kicks, and was only the second Thompson Twins album to be released there.

The album was the first collaboration between the band and producer Alex Sadkin and was recorded at Compass Point Studios in the Bahamas. The singer Grace Jones (who had worked with Sadkin on three of her studio albums by that time) made a guest appearance on the track "Watching", though her vocals were not included on the track when it was remixed and released as a single in mid-1983.

The album has several different versions according to different territories, containing different tracks and different track order. The UK, Canadian, and US cassette versions of the album also contained a whole side of remixes of various album tracks.

Critical reception

Reviewing the album in Record magazine, Crispin Sartwell noted that the songs "Love On Your Side", "Tears", "Love Lies Bleeding", and especially "Lies" achieved a funk that could appeal to both black and white listeners, but that the songs on Side Two of the record veer more towards the pretentious music of their first two albums. He nonetheless concluded the album to be one of the best examples of British funk to date.

Track listing

UK release
Side one
 "Love On Your Side"
 "Lies"
 "If You Were Here"
 "Judy Do"
 "Tears"

Side two
 "Watching"
 "We Are Detective"
 "Kamikaze"
 "Love Lies Bleeding"
 "All Fall Out"

US release
Side one
 "Love On Your Side"
 "Tears"
 "Lies"
 "We Are Detective"
 "Love Lies Bleeding"

Side two
 "Watching"
 "If You Were Here"
 "Kamikaze"
 "Judy Do"
 "All Fall Out"

Cassette Remixes
 "Love Lies Fierce" – 6:45 (Dub remix of "Love Lies Bleeding").
 "Long Beach Culture" – 6:48 (Extended version of "Beach Culture")
 "No Talkin'" – 6:18 (Dub remix of "Lies")
 "Rap Boy Rap" – 7:22 (Original 12" version of "Love On Your Side")
 "Frozen in Time" – 6:28 (Dub remix of "Kamikaze")
 "Fallen Out" – 3:30 (Dub remix of "All Fall Out")

2008 expanded edition
In March 2008, Quick Step & Side Kick was reissued as a 2-disc set by Edsel Records and included the bonus remixes that appeared on the original 1983 cassette version of the album. The second disc included most major 12" versions and B-sides, some of which appeared on CD for the first time.

Disc one
 "Love on Your Side" – 3:33
 "Lies" – 3:13
 "If You Were Here" – 2:56
 "Judy Do" – 3:48
 "Tears" – 5:02
 "Watching" – 3:58
 "We Are Detective" – 3:06
 "Kamikaze" – 3:55
 "Love Lies Bleeding" – 2:50
 "All Fall Out" – 5:28
 "Love Lies Fierce" – 6:45 
 "Long Beach Culture" – 6:48 
 "No Talkin'" – 6:18 
 "Rap Boy Rap" – 7:22 
 "Frozen in Time" – 6:28
 "Fallen Out" – 3:30

Disc two
 "Lies (Single Remix)" – 3:15
 "Love on Your Back" – 4:06 (Original B-Side of the "Love On Your Side" 7" Single)
 "Lucky Day" – 3:52 (Original B-Side of the "We Are Detective" 7" Single)
 "Dancersaurus" – 4:40 (Original B-Side of the "Watching" 7" Single)
 "Lies (Bigger and Better)" – 6:35 (Original 12" remix of "Lies")
 "Beach Culture" – 3:55 (Original B-Side of the "Lies" 7" Single)
 "Love On Your Side (No Talkin')" – 5:48 (B-Side of the original "Love On Your Side" 12" Single)
 "We Are Detective (More Clues)" – 6:00 (Original 12" remix of "We Are Detective")
 "Lucky Day (Space Mix)" – 6:58 (B-Side of the "We Are Detective" 12" Single)
 "Watching (You Watching Me)" – 5:48 (Original 12" remix of "Watching")
 "Dancersaurus (Even Large Reptiles Have Emotional Problems)" – 5:50 (B-Side of the "Watching" 12" Single)

Charts

Weekly charts

Year-end charts

Sales and certifications

Songs used in other media
 "If You Were Here" was used
 as the ending theme for the film Sixteen Candles (1984)
 in the Bob's Burgers episode "Sheesh! Cab, Bob?"
 in "Hell Week", episode 2 of Scream Queens.
 in the film Not Another Teen Movie (2001)
 as the ending song in Fun Mom Dinner (2017)
 as the ending song in "Central intelligence"
 towards the end of the American Dad! episode "1600 Candles"
 in the Dummy episode "Subtextual Feminism".
 "Love On Your Side" was featured on the in-game radio station "Wave 103" in Grand Theft Auto: Vice City Stories (2006).
 "Lies" was featured in the Regular Show first-season episode "Grilled Cheese Deluxe."
 "Kamikaze" was used in Cipher the Video, an anime adaption of the manga Cipher by Minako Narita.

Personnel
Thompson Twins
 Tom Bailey – vocals, synthesizers, drum programming
 Joe Leeway – synthesizers, congas, vocals 
 Alannah Currie – percussion, xylophone, vocals

Additional Musicians
 Boris Williams – cymbals on "If You Were Here" and "Tears"
 Monte Brown – guitars on "Watching"
 Grace Jones – backing vocals on "Watching"

Production
 Alex Sadkin – producer
 Phil Thornalley – engineer
 Ted Jensen – mastering at Sterling Sound (New York City, New York, USA).
 David Shortt – art direction
 Satori Graphic – design 
 Jeremy Pemberton – design
 Roger Charity – photography 
 John Hade – management

References

External links
 

1983 albums
Thompson Twins albums
Arista Records albums
Albums produced by Alex Sadkin